This article is about the particular significance of the year 1873 to Wales and its people.

Incumbents

Lord Lieutenant of Anglesey – William Owen Stanley 
Lord Lieutenant of Brecknockshire – Charles Morgan, 1st Baron Tredegar
Lord Lieutenant of Caernarvonshire – Edward Douglas-Pennant, 1st Baron Penrhyn 
Lord Lieutenant of Cardiganshire – Edward Pryse
Lord Lieutenant of Carmarthenshire – John Campbell, 2nd Earl Cawdor 
Lord Lieutenant of Denbighshire – William Cornwallis-West  
Lord Lieutenant of Flintshire – Sir Stephen Glynne, 9th Baronet 
Lord Lieutenant of Glamorgan – Christopher Rice Mansel Talbot 
Lord Lieutenant of Merionethshire – Edward Lloyd-Mostyn, 2nd Baron Mostyn
Lord Lieutenant of Monmouthshire – Henry Somerset, 8th Duke of Beaufort
Lord Lieutenant of Montgomeryshire – Sudeley Hanbury-Tracy, 3rd Baron Sudeley
Lord Lieutenant of Pembrokeshire – William Edwardes, 4th Baron Kensington
Lord Lieutenant of Radnorshire – John Walsh, 1st Baron Ormathwaite

Bishop of Bangor – James Colquhoun Campbell
Bishop of Llandaff – Alfred Ollivant 
Bishop of St Asaph – Joshua Hughes 
Bishop of St Davids – Connop Thirlwall

Events
1 March – The sailing ship Chacabuco sinks off the Great Orme with the loss of 24 lives.
18 March – Work begins on construction of the Severn Tunnel.
30 March – The Glyn Valley Tramway opens as a horse-worked line to carry slate and other minerals from Glyn Ceiriog to Chirk.
19 August – The Holyhead Breakwater (the longest in the world) is officially opened by Albert Edward, Prince of Wales. having taken 28 years to construct.
9 October – The first recorded sheepdog trial in the UK takes place at Bala.
2 December – In a mining accident at Hafod Colliery, Rhiwabon, five men are killed.
date unknown – Construction of:
Tŵr Mawr Lighthouse on Ynys Llanddwyn.
Buckley Arms hotel, Dinas Mawddwy, in reinforced concrete.

Arts and literature

New books
Rhoda Broughton – Nancy
Robert Elis (Cynddelw) – Manion Hynafiaethol
Ebenezer Thomas – Gweithiau Barddonol Eben Fardd (posthumously published)

Music
Henry Brinley Richards – Songs of Wales
Richard Davies (Mynyddog) writes the song "Rheolau yr Aelwyd", the basis of "Sosban Fach".

Sport
December – Major Walter Wingfield of Nantclwyd Hall at Llanelidan designs a game for the amusement of his visitors. Wingfield soon patents nets for the game of lawn tennis, which he calls "sphairistike".

Births
7 January – Christopher Williams, artist (died 1934)
16 January – Ivor Guest, 1st Viscount Wimborne, politician (died 1939)
7 April
John Dyfnallt Owen, poet and Archdruid (died 1956)
Charles Butt Stanton, politician (died 1946)
23 April – Sir Robert Thomas, 1st Baronet, politician (died 1951)
1 May – Harry Evans, musician (died 1914)
22 May – J. Brynach Davies (Brynach) (died 1923)
5 June – Ben Davies, Wales international rugby player (died 1930)
date unknown – Arthur Tysilio Johnson ("The Perfidious Welshman") (died 1956)

Deaths
January – John Emlyn Jones, poet, 54
27 January – Josiah Thomas Jones, publisher, 73
20 February – (at Launceston, Tasmania) William Jones, Chartist leader, 64
29 March – David Jones, merchant in Australia, 80
17 May – Lord William Paget, soldier and politician, 70 
9 October – John Evan Thomas, sculptor, 63
31 October – William Ambrose (Emrys), poet, 60
10 November – Maria Jane Williams, musician, 78

References

Wales